Chizuko is a feminine Japanese given name. Notable people with the name include:

, Japanese voice actress
, Japanese clairvoyant
Chizuko Judy Sugita de Queiroz, American artist and art educator
, Japanese politician
Chizuko Tanaka, Japanese athlete
, Japanese socialist
, Japanese artist
Chizuko Okamoto, murderer of Rikako Okamoto

Fictional characters
Chizuko Katao, a character in Chizuko's Younger Sister

Japanese feminine given names